Como Karim (Chomo / Shomo, Kirim) is a Jukunoid language of Nigeria.

References

Jukunoid languages
Languages of Nigeria